The ECHL Hall of Fame is an ice hockey museum dedicated to honoring members that have played in the ECHL (formerly known as the East Coast Hockey League). It was created by the league in 2008. The ECHL Board of Governors created the ECHL Hall of Fame to recognize the achievements of players, coaches, and personnel who dedicated their careers to the league.  Hall of Fame members are selected in four categories: Player, Developmental Player, Builder, and Referee/Linesman. Players must have concluded their career as an active player for a minimum of three playing seasons, though not continuous or full seasons. Developmental Players must have begun their career in the ECHL and went on to a distinguished career in the NHL, playing a minimum of 260 regular season games in the NHL, AHL and ECHL. Builders may be active or inactive whereas Referee/Linesman must have concluded their active officiating career for a minimum of three playing seasons.

No more than five candidates are elected to the Hall of Fame each year with no more than three Players, one Developmental Player, two Builders and one Referee/Linesman. The Builder and the Referee/Linesman categories are dependent upon the number of candidates in the Player category.

The nomination and subsequent selection of candidates is determined by the ECHL Hall of Fame Selection Committee which is appointed by the ECHL.

The ECHL Hall of Fame inaugural class was inducted during the 2008 ECHL All-Star Game festivities at Stockton Arena in Stockton, California, and included ECHL founder Henry Brabham, the ECHL's first commissioner Patrick J. Kelly, and former players Nick Vitucci and Chris Valicevic.

List of Hall of Famers

Inductees by team
12: Hampton Roads Admirals (includes one owner and two coaches)
9: League executives
7: Toledo Storm
5: Augusta Lynx, Charlotte Checkers (includes one owner and one coach), Dayton Bombers (includes one owner and one coach), Louisiana IceGators, Pensacola Ice Pilots (includes one coach), South Carolina Stingrays (includes on coach)
4: Greensboro Monarchs, Greenville Grrrowl (includes owner and one coach), Mobile Mysticks (includes one manager), Wheeling Nailers/Thunderbirds (includes one coach)
3: Birmingham Bulls (including one manager), Columbus Chill, Gwinnett Gladiators (including one manager), Johnstown Chiefs (including one president), Richmond Renegades, Tallahassee Tiger Sharks, Winston-Salem Thunderbirds
2: Baton Rouge Kingfish, Cincinnati Cyclones, Erie Panthers, Fresno Falcons, Huntington Blizzard, Jackson Bandits (includes one coach), Mississippi Sea Wolves, Pee Dee Pride, Peoria Rivermen, Raleigh Icecaps, Roanoke Express, Trenton Titans/Devils (includes one player/coach and manager)
1: Alaska Aces, Arkansas RiverBlades, Atlantic City Boardwalk Bullies, Chesapeake Icebreakers, Greensboro Generals, Jacksonville Lizard Kings, Kalamazoo Wings, Las Vegas Wranglers, Louisville Icehawks, Louisville RiverFrogs, Miami Matadors, Reading Royals (coach), Utah Grizzlies, Victoria Salmon Kings

See also
Hockey Hall of Fame
AHL Hall of Fame

References

External links

+Hall
Ice hockey museums and halls of fame
Awards established in 2008
Organizations based in Princeton, New Jersey
Halls of fame in New Jersey